Aleksandr Popov (born 17 November 1959) is a Soviet and Russian weightlifter who competed in the 1980s and 1990s. He won several World and European medals.

In 1988, Popov set the clean and jerk world record of 242.5 kg in the 100 kg weight class. That same year, he took part in the Seoul Olympics, but had to compete in the heavier (110 kg) category and finished fifth.

References

External links

Living people
1959 births
Sportspeople from Krasnoyarsk
Soviet male weightlifters
Russian male weightlifters
World Weightlifting Championships medalists
Olympic weightlifters of the Soviet Union
Weightlifters at the 1988 Summer Olympics
European Weightlifting Championships medalists